was a professional 7 dan Go player.

Biography
Takabe was a pupil of Honinbo Shuei, the 17th and 19th head of the Honinbō house. In the 1920s, he joined the Kiseisha, a splinter group of the Nihon Ki-in, Japan's main administrative body for Go. The Kiseisha was succeeded by the Keiinsha, of which Takabe was also a member, until 1991 when the last of its members died. In addition, he was one of the five Hiseikai, a group formed in 1922 and devoted to tournament play. The other members of the Hiseikai were Chiyotaro Onoda, Segoe Kensaku, Tamejiro Suzuki and Karigane Junichi.

Nakano Kiichiro was Takabe's only pupil.

Notes

Japanese Go players
1881 births
1951 deaths